William Brooks may refer to:

 William Thomas Brooks (1889–1943), police officer that led 1923 Victorian police strike
 William Brooks (Australian politician) (1858–1937), New South Wales politician
 William Brooks (footballer) (1873–?), English footballer
 William Brooks (died 1782), founder of English gentlemen's club Brooks's
 William Brooks, 2nd Baron Crawshaw (1853–1929), English nobleman
 William Brooks of Blackburn (1762–1846), cotton supplier
 William Collin Brooks (1893–1959), British journalist, writer and broadcaster
 William Cunliffe Brooks (1819–1900), British lawyer and politician
 William Edwin Brooks (1828–1899), Irish civil engineer and ornithologist
 Bucky Brooks (William Eldridge Brooks, Jr., born 1971), American football player and sportswriter
 Bill Brooks (coach) (William J. Brooks, 1922–2010), American baseball and basketball coach
 William Keith Brooks (1848–1908), American zoologist
 William L. Brooks (1832–1874), American western outlaw
 Bill Brooks (wide receiver) (William T. Brooks, Jr., born 1964), former American football player
 Bud Brooks (William Brooks, 1930–2005), American football player
 Billy Brooks (William McKinley Brooks III, born 1953), American football player
 William A. Brooks (1864–1921), American surgeon, football player, coach, official, and rower
 William Michael Clifton Brooks, 4th Baron Crawshaw (1933–1997), English nobleman
 William P. Brooks (1851–1938), American agricultural scientist
 William Robert Brooks (1844–1921), American astronomer
 William T. H. Brooks (1821–1870), Union Army general during the American Civil War
 William Frederick Brooks (1863–1928), American businessman and politician

See also
 Smith Observatory and Dr. William R. Brooks House, historic home and observatory in Geneva, New York, U.S.
 Brooks Farm, also known as the William Brooks Farm, historic farmsite in Troy, Michigan, U.S.
 Bill Brooks (disambiguation)
 William Brookes (disambiguation)
 William Penny Brookes (1809–1895), English physician and botanist, involved in the Olympics
 William Brooke (disambiguation)
 Bill Brookes, rugby league footballer of the 1900s for Hunslet